Travis Fennell Curtis (born September 27, 1965) is a former American football defensive back in the National Football League for the St. Louis/Phoenix Cardinals, Washington Redskins, Minnesota Vikings, and the New York Jets.  He played college football at West Virginia University.

1965 births
Living people
People from Washington, D.C.
American football safeties
West Virginia Mountaineers football players
St. Louis Cardinals (football) players
Phoenix Cardinals players
Minnesota Vikings players
New York Jets players
Washington Redskins players
National Football League replacement players